Jonathan Åstrand (born 9 September 1985 in Närpes, Finland) is a Finnish sprinter. At the 2012 Summer Olympics, he competed in the Men's 200 metres. He has a personal best of 10.26 in the 100 meters and 20.50 in the 200 metres.

References

External links
 

Finnish male sprinters
1985 births
Living people
Olympic athletes of Finland
Athletes (track and field) at the 2012 Summer Olympics
People from Närpes
Sportspeople from Ostrobothnia (region)